Miditech Pvt. Ltd. is an Indian television production company based in Gurgaon, Mumbai, and Bangalore, India. It was founded in 1992 by brothers, Niret Alva and Nikhil, Alva and is today a Rs 50-crore television software company.

The company creates documentaries and programming for television.

Programs
  Living on the Edge (TV Magazine featuring environmental issues)
 Head On! (Documentary of 1996 Charkhi Dadri mid-air collision)
 Air Hijack (Documentary of Indian Airlines Flight 814)
  Inside : Mumbai Terror Attack
 Wheels (TV series) (1998)
 Hum 2 Hain Na (2004)
 Fame Gurukul (Reality-singing competition) (2005)
 Indian Idol (Reality-singing competition) (2005–2009)
 Deal Ya No Deal (TV series) (2005)
 Galli Galli Sim Sim (TV series) (2006)
 M.A.D. (Art & Craft Show) (2005)
 Chhoona Hai Aasmaan (TV series) (2007)
 K For Kishore (2007) 
 Champion Chaalbaaz No.1 (Reality-comedy show) (2007)
 Naya Roop Nayi Zindagi (Reality-makeover show) (2008)
 PokerFace: Dil Sachcha Chehra Jhootha (Reality-game show) (2009)
 Iss Jungle Se Mujhe Bachao (Reality-game show) (2009)
 Sitaron Ko Choona Hai (Reality-talent show) (2009)
 Ninja Pandav (Reality-show) (2009)
 Sarkaar Ki Duniya (Reality-show) (2009)
 Shaitaan: A Criminal Mind (Crime Drama Series) (2013)
 Kyuki Jeena Isi Ka Naam Hai'' (TV series)

Productions

References

External links

 Miditech, Official website

Companies based in Gurgaon
Film production companies based in Mumbai
Companies established in 1993
Television production companies of India
Film production companies based in Bangalore
Film production companies of Haryana
1993 establishments in Haryana
Indian companies established in 1993